Roberto Sciascia (born 23 February 1960 in Italy) is a Belgian retired footballer.

Career

In 1986, Sciascia signed for Udinese Calcio in the Italian top flight. However, despite being eligible to qualify as an Italian through his parents, he had to register as a foreign player. While waiting for over a year to get registration, Sciascia played a few friendlies with the club but eventually left for Associazione Sportiva Dilettantistica Vittorio Falmec San Martino Colle in the Italian amateur leagues.

Honours

Club 
Standard Liège

 Belgian First Division: 1981–82, 1982–83
 Belgian Super Cup: 1981
 European Cup Winners' Cup: 1981-82 (runners-up)
 Intertoto Cup Group Winners: 1982

References

External links

 Roberto Sciascia at ForaDeJogo.net

Belgian footballers
Living people
Association football midfielders
1960 births